Gibberula robinsonae is a species of sea snail, a marine gastropod mollusk, in the family Cystiscidae.

Description
The length of the shell attains 2.5 mm.

Distribution
This marine species occurs in Guadeloupe.

References

robinsonae
Gastropods described in 2015